The 1954 Taça de Portugal Final was the final match of the 1953–54 Taça de Portugal, the 14th season of the Taça de Portugal, the premier Portuguese football cup competition organized by the Portuguese Football Federation (FPF). The match was played on 27 June 1954 at the Estádio Nacional in Oeiras, and opposed two Primeira Liga sides: Sporting CP and Vitória de Setúbal. Sporting CP defeated Vitória de Setúbal 3–2 to claim their fifth Taça de Portugal.

Match

Details

References

1954
Taca
Sporting CP matches
Vitória F.C. matches